Spoerri is a surname. Notable people with the surname include:

Bruno Spoerri (born 1935), Swiss jazz and electronics musician
Daniel Spoerri (born 1930), Swiss artist and writer
Otto Spoerri (1933–2008), Swiss accountant
Theophil Spoerri (1890–1974), Swiss writer and academic